Isaac Ingram (14 May 1855 – 19 November 1947) was an English professional cricketer. He was a right-handed batsman who fielded as a wicket-keeper. He was born at Leigh near Tonbridge in Kent in 1855.

Ingram made his first-class cricket debut for Kent County Cricket Club against MCC in May 1878 at Lord's. He played a total of 11 times for the county in 1878 before appearing one final time against Nottinghamshire at Canterbury in 1879. In local cricket he played for Leigh Cricket Club and for Chiddingstone Causeway where he worked making Dukes cricket balls in the company's factory.

Ingram received a pension of 7/6d from Kent until he died at Leigh in November 1947 aged 92.

References

External links

1855 births
1947 deaths
People from Leigh, Kent
English cricketers
Kent cricketers
Wicket-keepers